Clearidas  is a genus of Cricket in family Gryllidae.

Taxonomy
The genus contains the following species:
Clearidas dimidiatus Chopard, 1940
Clearidas nigriceps Stål, 1876

References

Gryllinae
Orthoptera genera
Taxa named by Carl Stål